Zatouna is a mountain village and a community in the municipal unit of Dimitsana, western Arcadia, Peloponnese, Greece. It is situated on a mountain slope at about 1000 m elevation, west of the river Lousios. In 2011 Zatouna had a population of 45 for the village and 71 for the community, which includes the nearby villages Markos and Vlongos. Zatouna is 2 km southwest of Dimitsana and 23 km northwest of Megalopoli. It is considered a traditional settlement.

Population

People
Zatouna is the birthplace of Staikos Staikopoulos, who laid siege to the castle of Palamidi in 1821 while it was under Turkish control. The Greek composer Mikis Theodorakis was banished to the village in 1968 by the military junta.
Famous Greek actor Mimis Fotopoulos (1913–1986) was born in Zatouna.

See also
List of settlements in Arcadia
List of traditional settlements of Greece

References

External links
Geography, history, news and photos from Zatouna
History and Information about Zatouna
Zatouna on the GTP Travel Pages

Populated places in Arcadia, Peloponnese